The Inspector-General of Police abbreviated as IGP, is the highest ranked officer of the Kenya Police Force, responsible commanding and leading the Kenya Police. He is also in charge of overall and independent command and matter of the National Police Service. The position was established in 1964 as the Commissioner of Police. It was renamed to Inspection General of Police in 2012, to serve as the head of the two Police bodies of Kenya for a four-year term. The Kenya Police Service and the Administration Police Service is also headed by a Deputy Inspector- General. He is appointed by the President of Kenya and approved by the Parliament. The current Inspector General is Hillary Mutyambai, who is the third holder of the IGP position.

List of officeholders

Commissioner of Police (1964-2012) 
 Bernard Hinga 1964–1978
 Ben Gethi 1978–1982
 Bernard Njinu 1982–1988
 Phillip Kilonzo 1988–1993
 Shedrack Kiruki 1993–1996
 Duncan Wachira 1996–1998
 Philemon Abong’o 1998–2002
 Edwin Nyaseda 2002–2003
 Maj Gen. Mohammed Hussein Ali 2004–2009
 Mathew Kirai Iteere 2009–2012

Inspector-Generals of Police (2012 - present) 
 David Mwole Kimaiyo, 2012–2014
 Samuel Arachi, acting and Deputy Inpsector General-Administration Police Service 31 December 2014 – 11 March 2015
 Joseph Kipchirchir Boinett, 11 March 2015 – March 2019
 Hillary Nzioki Mutyambai, 8 April 2019

References 

Law enforcement in Kenya